Throughout the 21st century, retail businesses in Canada have felt the pressures of foreign store expansions into the country, as well as a shift towards online retail. As a result, closures have been a mix of stores unique to the nation, as well as newcomers like Target Canada. Yes, Target, Kmart, consumers distributing, Simpson's, Eaton's, Birk's,

List of retailers

The final two Overwaitea Foods stores were closed in 2018, and reopened as Save-On-Foods.

References

21st century in Canada
Canadian
retail
Canadian
Economic history of Canada
History of retail
Retailing in Canada